The Joungane Peaks are a line of about four small peaks just north of Storjoen Peak in the Sverdrup Mountains of Queen Maud Land, Antarctica. They were plotted from air photos by the Third German Antarctic Expedition (1938–39), remapped by Norwegian cartographers from surveys and air photos by the Norwegian–British–Swedish Antarctic Expedition (1949–52) and from air photos by the Norwegian expedition (1958–59) and named Joungane.

References

Mountains of Queen Maud Land
Princess Martha Coast